Genesis is the debut studio album by Japanese visual kei band Diaura, released on 21 March 2012 by Ains. The song "Imperial Core" was previously released as a single on November 14, 2011. The DVD included with the album contained a music video for the song "Terrors". On December 19, 2012 a second press version of the album was released, with an additional song.

Reception 
Allmusic writer John D. Buchanan stated "this is one of the best debuts VK had ever seen, spectacularly fulfilling Diaura's promise and cementing their place as one of the pre-eminent bands in the scene." He praised the choruses and yo-ka's "rich tenor" voice, the band's adhering to heavy metal theatricality but keeping their music melodic and the guitar solos tasteful.  As a minor criticism, he mentioned "throwaway, chugtastic verses" and the drums and the guitar sounding "flat", possibly due to low budget production.

Track listing

References

2012 debut albums
Heavy metal albums by Japanese artists
Alternative metal albums by Japanese artists
Diaura albums